Darrell Ward (August 13, 1964 – August 28, 2016) was an American reality television personality. He was a truck driver featured on Ice Road Truckers from season six in 2012 until his death. He was from Deer Lodge, Montana, and died in a plane crash.

On August 28, 2016, Ward died in a plane crash while travelling in a single-engined Cessna 182 Skylane with pilot Mark Melotz. They were attempting to land at a nearby airstrip in Rock Creek, Montana. The plane had departed 53 minutes earlier from Missoula for Rock Creek. The National Transportation Safety Board concluded the cause of the accident to be "The sudden right turn on approach to landing for reasons that could not be determined because a post-accident examination did not reveal any anomalies that would have precluded normal operation."

References

1964 births
2016 deaths
Accidental deaths in Montana
Aviators killed in aviation accidents or incidents in the United States
American truck drivers
People from Missoula, Montana
People from Deer Lodge, Montana
Victims of aviation accidents or incidents in 2016